USS Anthony (DD-172) was a  built for the United States Navy during World War I.

Description
The Wickes class was an improved and faster version of the preceding . Two different designs were prepared to the same specification that mainly differed in the turbines and boilers used. The ships built to the Bethlehem Steel design, built in the Fore River and Union Iron Works shipyards, mostly used Yarrow boilers that deteriorated badly during service and were mostly scrapped during the 1930s. They had a crew of 6 officers and 108 enlisted men.

Performance differed radically between the ships of the class, often due to poor workmanship. The Wickes class was powered by two steam turbines, each driving one propeller shaft, using steam provided by four water-tube boilers.

The ships were armed with four 4-inch (102 mm) guns in single mounts and were fitted with two 1-pounder guns for anti-aircraft defense. Their primary weapon, though, was their torpedo battery of a dozen 21 inch (533 mm) torpedo tubes in four triple mounts. In many ships a shortage of 1-pounders caused them to be replaced by 3-inch (76 mm) anti-aircraft (AA) guns. They also carried a pair of depth charge rails. A "Y-gun" depth charge thrower was added to many ships.

Construction and career
Anthony, named for Marine Sergeant Major William Anthony, was launched 10 August 1918 by Union Iron Works, San Francisco, California; sponsored by Miss Grace Heathcote; commissioned 19 June 1919 Commander D. A. Scott in command; and reported to Destroyer Division Pacific. Anthony operated on the west coast between San Diego and Bremerton, Washington, until June 1921. She sailed on 8 September 1919 from San Francisco to Port Angeles, Washington, to attend the ceremonies of the newly organized Pacific Fleet. Anthony visited Victoria, British Columbia, 11 September and returned Secretary of the Navy Josephus Daniels to Bremerton on 12 September. On 13 September she passed review, with other units of the fleet, before President Woodrow Wilson in Oregon (BB-3) and, on 14 September before the Secretary of the Navy.

On 16 November 1920 Anthony was designated a light minelayer, DM-12. In October 1921 she joined Mine Division 1, Mine Squadron 2 and operated in the Pearl Harbor area until placed out of commission on 30 June 1922 at Pearl Harbor. She was towed to San Diego in 1937, used as a target, and sunk off the California coast on 22 July 1937.

Notes

References

External links

 history.navy.mil: USS Anthony 
 NavSource Photos

 

Anthony (DD-172)
Maritime incidents in 1937
Ships sunk as targets
Shipwrecks of the California coast
Ships built in San Francisco
1918 ships
Wickes-class destroyer minelayers